The 1982 Women's Audi British Open Squash Championships was held at the Churchill Theatre in Bromley from 1–7 April 1982. The event was won for the third consecutive year by Vicki Cardwell (née Hoffman) who defeated Lisa Opie in the final.

Draw and results

First round

Main draw

References

Women's British Open Squash Championships
Women's British Open Squash Championship
Women's British Open Squash Championship
Sport in the London Borough of Bromley
Squash competitions in London
Women's British Open Squash Championship
1982 in women's squash
Women's British Open